Protein methylase I may refer to:

 Histone-arginine N-methyltransferase
 (Myelin basic protein)-arginine N-methyltransferase